Nam Hang Tsuen is a village in the Shap Pat Heung area of Yuen Long District, Hong Kong.

The village of Nam Hang Pai is located directly to its west.

Administration
Nam Hang Tsuen is a recognized village under the New Territories Small House Policy.

History
At the time of the 1911 census, the population of Nam Hang was 104. The number of males was 44.

Education
Nam Hang is in Primary One Admission (POA) School Net 74. Within the school net are multiple aided schools (operated independently but funded with government money) and one government school: Yuen Long Government Primary School (元朗官立小學).

See also
 Yuen Tsuen Ancient Trail

References

External links

 Delineation of area of existing village Nam Hang (Shap Pat Heung) for election of resident representative (2019 to 2022)
 Antiquities Advisory Board. Historic Building Appraisal. No. 5 Nam Hang Tsuen, Shap Pat Heung Pictures

Villages in Yuen Long District, Hong Kong
Shap Pat Heung